Erin Sullivan was a member of the Ohio House of Representatives, serving from 1998 to 2002. Her district consisted of much of lower Cuyahoga County, Ohio.  She was preceded by Tom Patton.

References 

Democratic Party members of the Ohio House of Representatives
Women state legislators in Ohio
Living people
21st-century American politicians
21st-century American women politicians
Year of birth missing (living people)